Timothy O'Brien is a Professor and Director of The Regenerative Medicine Institute (REMEDI). The Institute was established in collaboration with National University of Ireland, Galway as a Centre for Science, Engineering & Technology (CSET) and has been supported with funding of €14.9 million by Science Foundation Ireland (SFI) to conduct basic and applied research in regenerative medicine, an emerging field that combines the technologies of gene therapy and adult stem cell therapy.  The goal is to use cells and genes to regenerate healthy tissues that can be used to repair or replace other tissues and organs with a minimally invasive approach.

Centres for Science, Engineering & Technology help link scientists and engineers in partnerships across academia and industry to address crucial research questions, foster the development of new and existing Irish-based technology companies, attract industry that could make an important contribution to Ireland and its economy, and expand educational and career opportunities in Ireland in science and engineering. CSETs must exhibit outstanding research quality, intellectual breadth, active collaboration, flexibility in responding to new research opportunities, and integration of research and education in the fields that SFI supports.

Professional background

O'Brien graduated from University College Cork with a MB BCh BAO (Honours) and a PhD. He is a Fellow of the Royal College of Physicians of Ireland and a Fellow of the American College of Endocrinology.

He returned to Ireland from the United States in 2000 where he held positions at University of California-San Francisco and in Endocrinology at the Mayo Clinic, Rochester MN.  He focuses his research on cardiovascular disease and has a special interest in diabetic vascular disorders.

External links
Regenerative Medicine Institute (REMEDI)
Science Foundation Ireland
University of Ireland, Galway
Mayo Clinic

Year of birth missing (living people)
Living people
People from County Cork
Irish medical researchers
Irish endocrinologists
Fellows of the Royal College of Physicians